Colin Morrison  is a British publishing executive, who is the chairman, non-executive director and consultant of several media and digital companies in Europe and Asia. He publishes the newsletter Flashes & Flames: The Global Media Weekly, which he originally launched as a blog in 2012. He is a senior advisor to the New York media investment bank JEGI and is on the advisory board of the Royal National Children's SpringBoard Foundation.

Morrison has managed media businesses (magazines, newspapers, online, TV production, international licensing, B2B information and exhibitions) in the UK, across Europe, the US, and Asia–Pacific. He has been involved in media partnerships and joint ventures with Sony, Microsoft, the BBC, Hearst, Axel Springer, Dennis, The Washington Post, Press Association and Hachette.

He was chairman of SBTV News, a partnership between online platform SBTV and the Press Association (launched with Jamal Edwards), GlobeLinx Networks, Pharmaceutical Press, and also of Great Golf Media. He was also the founding chair of Boarding School Partnerships 2017-21, an information service launched by the UK Department for Education under Lord Nash, the under secretary of state for schools. In July 2018, he announced a Partnership Bursaries scheme under which 38 independent boarding schools would offer 40% bursaries to boarders in and on the edge of local authority care.

Morrison said he hoped the scheme would help many more vulnerable young people to attend boarding schools - like he had decades before.

Career
After starting his career as a journalist variously in London (Lloyd's List), Dublin (Sunday Press) and New York (Seatrade), he was successively publisher, publishing director and deputy chief executive of Reed Business Information (1979-1991), chair at EMAP Communications (1991-1995), CEO of Australian Consolidated Press (1995-1999), CEO of Axel Springer International (1999-2001), chief operating officer and managing director of Future plc (2001-2003). and CEO of Australian Consolidated Press/ ACP Magazines and a director of Publishing and Broadcasting Ltd, in Australia.

From 2004 to March 2008, Morrison was chief executive of ACP-Natmag Magazines, a United Kingdom partnership between the National Magazine Company (owned by the Hearst Corporation) and the CVC-owned Australian Consolidated Press and was also CEO of ACP Media UK Ltd. Having established this weekly magazines group and been CEO since its formation four years before, Morrison left after selling ACP's 50% share to Hearst/NatMags.

He was the chairman of the TV production company GRB Entertainment (2000), Pharmaceutical Press (2001-2013), the British National Formulary (2004-2013), RCN Publishing (2011-2012), Globelynx (2010-) (part of the Press Association), and Skips Educational.

He has held several non-executive director positions: Centaur Media (2004-2103), IPCN (2008-2013), eQuoteCentral (2009-2010), Travel Weekly Group (2009-), Acclaimworks Ltd, Green Star Media Ltd, AA Media Ltd, Enthuse Group Ltd and Anthem Publishing. He is also a consultant to The Stage.

Professional and associations
He is a former chairman of Magazine Publishers of Australia (1996–1999), of British Business Press (1988–1993), and a director of the UK Professional Publishers Association (1989–1995, 2001–2003). He is a Freeman of the City of London and is liveryman of the Stationers Company, Fellow of the Royal Society of Arts, and Fellow of the Industry Parliament Trust. He is a member of the Cook Society and the Groucho, Savile, RAC and 1920 clubs. He was appointed an Officer of the Order of the British Empire (OBE) in the UK New Year Honours List in 2018, "for charitable services to Vulnerable Young People".

Philanthropy
Morrison was the longest-serving chairman in the 189-year history of the Royal National Children's Foundation (patron: The Princess Royal), of which he was formerly a beneficiary. In this role, during 2001–1016, Morrison campaigned for government to learn the lessons of the charity's work and what the UK's state and independent boarding schools can do to help transform the life prospects of vulnerable children.

From 2007 to 2011, he was a member of the UK government's Pathfinder group on vulnerable children and, in 2011, was responsible for launching the Assisted Boarding Network, supported by 60% of all local authorities in England and Wales and by the Department for Education This directly led to his launch of Boarding School Partnerships for the Department for Education in 2017. He is a guest speaker for Speakers for Schools.

Publishing
Morrison writes the newsletter Flashes & Flames on "media fortune, fame and folly". and is a contributor to Huffington Post In 2016, he was honoured in the Folio:100 in the US. The citation read: "Colin Morrison uses his authoritative and entertaining voice to critique the media industry. He is an insightful and entertaining mind in a wobbly industry, and Flashes & Flames serves as a forceful watchdog." Guest contributors to Flashes & Flames have included Lord Rothermere, Sir Martin Sorrell, John Ridding, Zillah Byng-Thorne and Arnaud de Puyfontaine.

References

External links
 Colin Morrison at DeSilva+Phillips biodata
 Colin Morrison's Blog - "Flashes & Flames"
 Colin Morrison in Huffinton Post

Australian chief executives
Corporate executives
Australian journalists
Living people
1951 births
Australian Officers of the Order of the British Empire